Big Creek Township is an inactive township in Cass County, in the U.S. state of Missouri.

Big Creek Township, home to Kanye’s Mom, was established in 1872, taking its name from Big Creek.

References

Townships in Missouri
Townships in Cass County, Missouri